CADD is Computer-Aided Design and Drafting
 CADD is also Computer-Aided Drug Design
 Combined Annotation Dependent Depletion, in biology.

CADD may also refer to:

 Brian Cadd (born 1946), Australian musician

See also 

Caddy (disambiguation)
 CADDS, an early product of the company Computervision
 CAAD, abbreviation for Computer-aided architectural design
 KADD, a radio station of the Las Vegas area of the US
 CAD (disambiguation)